Thames was launched at Southampton in 1790. Until 1798 she sailed across the Atlantic, trading primarily with The Bahamas. She then became a slave ship, making seven slave trading voyages. After the abolition of the British slave trade in 1807, Thames returned to trading with the West Indies. A French privateer captured Thames on 17 July 1811 and burnt her.

Career
Thames first appeared in Lloyd's Register in 1791.

1st slave voyage (1798–1799): Captain Andrew Chester sailed from London on 3 November 1798. Thames acquired her slaves at Cape Coast Castle. She arrived at St Vincent on 25 April 1799 with 338 slaves. She was sold in St Vincent. She arrived back at Dover from St Kitts in September.

2nd slave voyage (1800–1801): Captain Chester sailed from London on 11 January 1800. Thames acquired her slaves on the Gold Coast and then primarily at Whydah. She arrived at Demerara on 16 January 1801 with 213 slaves. 

3rd slave voyage (1801–1802): Captain George Black sailed from London on 8 June 1801. Thames acquired her slaves on the Gold Coast. She arrived in the West Indies in December, delivering slaves first at St Vincent and then arriving with 80 slaves at Tobago. She arrived back at London on 13 April 1802.

4th slave voyage (1802–1803): Captain Black sailed from London on 27 June 1802. Thames acquired her slaves on the Gold Coast. She arrived at Trinidad on 1 March 1803 with 236 slaves. She returned to London on 20 April 1803.

5th slave voyage (1803–1804): Captain Black sailed from London on 5 August 1803 and Portsmouth on 25 August. Thames began acquiring her slaves at Gold Coast Castle on 9 December. She also acquired slaves at Accra. She stopped at Barbados and arrived at Suriname on 11 May 1804 with 244 slaves. She sailed for London  on 13 July and arrived at London on 26 September.

In 1804 the slave trader Archibald Dalzel acquired Thames. 

6th slave voyage (1805–1806): Captain Black sailed from London on 10 January 1805. On 7 March she was at Madeira. Thames acquired her slaves at Cape Coast Castle and Accra from 4 April. She arrived at Suriname on 2 October with 249 slaves. Thames, David Glegg, master, sailed for London on 29 October (or 5 November) and arrived at Cork on 17 April, and London on 16 June 1806.

7th slave voyage (1806–1808): Captain R. Hall sailed from London on 2 October 1806. Thames acquired her slaves at Bane Island. She arrived at Trinidad on 25 July 1807 with 173 slaves. Her master was now C. Anderson. She arrived back at London, with Adamson, master, on 25 May 1808.

The Slave Trade Act 1807 ended British participation in the slave trade. New owners returned Thames to the West Indies trade. Miller & Co. purchased Thames from Dalzel in order to sail her as a West Indiaman between London and Grenada.

Captain Joseph Clark acquired a letter of marque on 25 January 1810.

Fate
Thames had been sailing from London to St Vincent's, and Lady Penrhyn from London to Grenada. Both vessels were in ballast, and Duc de Danzig burnt them after taking off the people on board them. She then captured the schooner Ann, which had set out from Barbados to Demerara. Duc de Dantzig put her prisoners aboard Ann and let her proceed; Ann arrived at Barbados on 26 July.

Notes

Citations

References

1790 ships
Age of Sail merchant ships of England
London slave ships
Captured ships
Maritime incidents in 1811